The Women's 100 metre breaststroke competition at the 2017 World Championships was held on 24 and 25 July 2017.

Records
Prior to the competition, the existing world and championship records were as follows.

The following new records were set during this competition.

Results

Heats
The heats were held on 24 July at 10:00.

Semifinals
The semifinals were started on 24 July at 17:58.

Semifinal 1

Semifinal 2

Final
The final was held on 25 July at 19:17.

References

Women's 100 metre breaststroke
2017 in women's swimming